Andoni Gorosabel Espinosa (born 4 August 1996) is a Spanish professional footballer who plays for Real Sociedad as a right back.

Club career
Born in Arrasate, Gipuzkoa, Basque Country, Gorosabel represented UD Aretxabaleta and Real Sociedad as a youth, appearing in the UEFA Youth League in 2013. On 11 July 2014, after finishing his formation, he was loaned to SD Beasain in Tercera División, making his senior debut during the season.

Upon returning, Gorosabel was assigned to farm team Berio FT, also in the fourth tier. On 9 July 2016, he was loaned to Segunda División B side Real Unión for one year.

On 16 June 2017, Gorosabel renewed his Real Sociedad contract until 2019 and was promoted to the reserves, also competing in the third level. He made his first team – and La Liga – debut on 21 September, starting in a 3–0 away loss against Levante UD.

On 5 December 2017, Gorosabel renewed his contract until 2021, and spent the remainder of the campaign as a second-choice to Álvaro Odriozola, overtaking longtime incumbent Carlos Martínez. In July 2018, as both Odriozola and Martínez left, he was definitely promoted to the main squad.

In March 2022, he reached the milestone of 100 appearances for Real Sociedad.

Career statistics

Club

Honours 
Real Sociedad

 Copa del Rey: 2019–20

References

External links
Profile at the Real Sociedad website

1996 births
Living people
People from Mondragón
Spanish footballers
Footballers from the Basque Country (autonomous community)
Association football defenders
La Liga players
Segunda División B players
Tercera División players
Real Unión footballers
Real Sociedad B footballers
Real Sociedad footballers
Real Sociedad C footballers
Sportspeople from Gipuzkoa
SD Beasain footballers